Cathail O'Mahony (born 1999) is an Irish Gaelic footballer who plays for Cork Intermediate Championship club Mitchelstown and at inter-county level with the Cork senior football team. He usually lines out as a full-forward.

Career statistics

Club

Inter-county

Honours

Mitchelstown
Cork Premier 2 Minor Football Championship (1): 2016

Cork
National Football League Division 3 (1): 2020
All-Ireland Under-20 Football Championship (1): 2019
Munster Under-20 Football Championship (1): 2019

References

1999 births
Living people
Mitchelstown Gaelic footballers
Cork inter-county Gaelic footballers